Events in the year 2003 in Cyprus.

Incumbents 

 President: Demetris Christofias
 President of the Parliament: Yiannakis Omirou

Events 
Ongoing – Cyprus dispute

 11 March – Kofi Annan, Secretary General of the United Nations, announces that UN-sponsored talks on the reunification of Cyprus have failed. Cyprus remains a candidate for EU membership and the Greek Cypriot government intends to sign on behalf of the whole island. Analysts suggested that Turkish opposition to unification may hurt Turkey's chances of joining the EU.

Deaths

References 

 
2000s in Cyprus
Years of the 21st century in Cyprus
Cyprus
Cyprus
Cyprus